Hear My Song is a 1991 British comedy-drama film directed by Peter Chelsom, who co-wrote the screenplay with Adrian Dunbar, based on the story of Irish tenor Josef Locke. It was nominated for Best Original Screenplay at the 46th British Academy Film Awards in 1993.

The film stars Ned Beatty (as Locke), Dunbar, Shirley Anne Field, Tara Fitzgerald, William Hootkins and David McCallum.

Plot
Micky O'Neill tries to revive the fortunes of his Liverpool nightclub by promising his patrons he will present a performance by the legendary Irish tenor Josef Locke. After a series of unfortunate bookings (including Franc Cinatra, a Sinatra impersonator), Micky books the mysterious Mr. X, a man who insists he cannot be booked as Joe Locke due to the legal issues that would invariably ensue. The elusive Locke left the United Kingdom during the 1950s to avoid paying taxes, leaving behind "a beauty queen, a Jaguar sportscar, and a pedigree dalmatian, all of them pining." O'Neill's personal and professional life are left in ruin after beauty queen Cathleen Doyle exposes his Mr. X as a fraud. O'Neill returns to Ireland to find the true Josef Locke and bring him back.

Cast

Reception
Hear My Song received positive reviews from critics, as the film holds a 90% rating on Rotten Tomatoes based on 29 reviews.

Awards
Nominated Best Original Screenplay BAFTA (Peter Chelsom, Adrian Dunbar)
Nominated Best Original Score BAFTA (Anthony Asquith Award) (John Altman)
Winner Best Comedy Film British Comedy Awards
Winner Best Technical Achievement Evening Standard British Film Awards (Sue Gordon, director of photography)
Winner Most Promising Newcomer Evening Standard British Film Awards (Peter Chelsom, screenwriter, director)
Nominated Best Supporting Actor Golden Globe (Ned Beatty)
Winner British Newcomer of the Year London Film Critics Circle (Peter Chelsom, screenwriter, director)

References

External links
 
 
 
 
 

1991 films
1991 comedy-drama films
1991 directorial debut films
1990s British films
1990s English-language films
British comedy-drama films
Films about singers
Films directed by Peter Chelsom
Films produced by Alison Owen
Films set in Liverpool
Films shot in County Clare
Films shot in Dublin (city)
Films shot in Liverpool